Kilimanjaro is the debut album by the neo-psychedelic Liverpool band The Teardrop Explodes, released on 10 October 1980. It contains versions of the band's early singles – "Sleeping Gas", "Bouncing Babies", "Treason" and "When I Dream" – as well as their biggest hit, "Reward". The album also includes the song "Books" – originally a song by Julian Cope's previous band, The Crucial Three, it was also recorded by Echo & the Bunnymen (as "Read it in Books", released on the B-side of their debut single, and featured on some versions of Crocodiles). In 2000, Q magazine placed Kilimanjaro at number 95 in its list of the 100 Greatest British Albums Ever.

The original working title for Kilimanjaro was Everyone Wants to Shag the Teardrop Explodes (this was later used for the CD release of demos for the band's never-finished third album). When originally released, the album featured a shadowy photograph of the band on the sleeve, but this was later changed to a cover showing Mount Kilimanjaro, the mountain after which the record was named. When the album was subsequently released on CD the cover artwork reverted to the original.

In 2000, Cope gave his blessings to re-release Kilimanjaro with a selection of bonus tracks (mainly single B-sides), original artwork, a remastered sound, and full lyrics and essays. A deluxe 3-disc edition followed in 2010, including original singles, B-sides and radio session recordings.

Track listing

All tracks composed by Julian Cope, Gary Dwyer and Michael Finkler; except where indicated.

Original 1980 track listing

 "Ha Ha I'm Drowning" (2.53)
 "Sleeping Gas" (Cope, Dwyer, Finkler, Paul Simpson) (3.45)
 "Treason" (3.05)
 "Second Head" (3.10)
 "Poppies in the Field" (5.03)
 "Went Crazy" (Cope, Finkler) (2.38)
 "Brave Boys Keep Their Promises" (2.30)
 "Bouncing Babies" (Cope, Dwyer, Finkler, Simpson) (2.28)
 "Books" (Cope, Ian McCulloch) (2.37)
 "The Thief of Baghdad" (3.09)
 "When I Dream" (5.10)

The original release did not include "Reward", which was added to later pressings after it became a hit single early in 1981. The reverse of the LP album sleeve had a running order different from that of the record itself.

The album was reissued with a new sleeve (the "Zebra" or "Mountain" sleeve), with "Reward" added as an extra track following "Second Head" in the running order. This reissue of the album was also remixed – most noticeably on "Went Crazy" and a longer version of "When I Dream".

U.S. version (Mercury SRM-1-4016)

This release featured the original sleeve photos and the following track listing.

 "Ha Ha I'm Drowning"
 "Treason"
 "Suffocate" (Cope, David Balfe)
 "Reward" (Cope, Alan Gill)
 "When I Dream"
 "Went Crazy" (Cope, Finkler)
 "Brave Boys Keep Their Promises"
 "Sleeping Gas" (Cope, Dwyer, Finkler, Simpson)
 "Books" (Cope, McCulloch)
 "The Thief of Baghdad"
 "Poppies in the Field"

This version of the album dropped "Second Head" and "Bouncing Babies" from the UK track line-up, but included "Suffocate" and "Reward" - the latter featuring a 12-second instrumental intro not included on the various UK releases of the song. This U.S. version of the album was reissued in the early 1990s on CD, LP and cassette by the New Jersey-based independent label Skyclad (LUCKY 7), but featuring the "Zebra" sleeve.

Total Playing time: 37:51.

2000 reissue track listing

 "Ha Ha I'm Drowning"
 "Sleeping Gas" (Cope, Dwyer, Finkler, Simpson)
 "Treason"
 "Second Head"
 "Poppies in the Field"
 "Went Crazy" (Cope, Finkler)
 "Brave Boys Keep Their Promises"
 "Bouncing Babies" (Cope, Dwyer, Finkler, Simpson)
 "Books" (Cope, McCulloch)
 "The Thief of Baghdad"
 "When I Dream"
 "Reward" (Cope, Gill)
 "Kilimanjaro" (Cope, Dwyer, Balfe, Gill)
 "Strange House in the Snow" (Cope, Balfe)
 "Use Me" (Cope)
 "Traison (C'est Juste Une Histoire)"
 "Sleeping Gas" (Live) (Cope, Dwyer, Finkler, Simpson)

2010 reissue

In 2010, the album was re-released as a 3-disc deluxe edition with the "zebra" cover artwork and the following track listing:

Disc 1 – (Kilimanjaro)
 "Ha Ha I'm Drowning"
 "Sleeping Gas" (Cope, Dwyer, Finkler, Simpson)
 "Treason"
 "Second Head"
 "Poppies"
 "Went Crazy" (Cope, Finkler)
 "Brave Boys Keep Their Promises"
 "Bouncing Babies" (Cope, Dwyer, Finkler, Simpson)
 "Books" (Cope, McCulloch)
 "Thief of Baghdad"
 "When I Dream" (longer version)

Disc 2 – (Bates Motel)

 "Reward" (Cope, Gill)
 "Sleeping Gas" (single version) (Cope, Dwyer, Finkler, Simpson)
 "Camera Camera (Goddamn Camera)" (Cope, Dwyer, Finkler, Simpson)
 "Kirby Workers Dream Fades" (Cope, Dwyer, Finkler, Simpson)
 "Bouncing Babies" (single version) (Cope, Dwyer, Finkler, Simpson)
 "All I am Is Loving You"
 "Treason" (Zoo single version)
 "Read It in Books" (Cope, McCulloch)
 "Kilimanjaro" (Cope, Dwyer, Balfe, Gill)
 "Strange House in the Snow" (Cope, Balfe)
 "Use Me" (Cope)
 "Traison (C'est Juste Une Histoire)"
 "Sleeping Gas" (live version) (Cope, Dwyer, Finkler, Simpson)
(Tracks 1 & 10 from "Reward" single; tracks 2 to 4 from original "Sleeping Gas" single; tracks 5 & 6 from original "Bouncing Babies" single; tracks 7 & 8 from original "Treason" single"; track 9 was the B-side to "When I Dream" single; tracks 11 & 12 from "Treason" single reissue)
Disc 3 – (BBC Sessions)

 "Brave Boys Keep Their Promises" (Peel Session, 15 October 1979)
 "Ha Ha I'm Drowning" (Peel Session, 15 October 1979)
 "Went Crazy" (Cope, Finkler) (Peel Session, 15 October 1979)
 "Chance" (Cope, Dwyer) (Peel Session, 15 October 1979)
 "Thief of Baghdad" (Peel Session, 24 April 1980)
 "When I Dream" (Peel Session, 24 April 1980)
 "Poppies in the Field" (Peel Session, 24 April 1980)
 "Reward" (Cope, Gill) (Mike Read Session, 27 October 1980)
 "Suffocate" (Cope, Balfe) (Mike Read Session, 27 October 1980)
 "For Years" (Mike Read Session, 27 October 1980)
 "The Great Dominions" (Cope) (Mike Read Session, 27 October 1980)
(Tracks 1 to 4 recorded 2 October 1979; tracks 5 to 7 recorded 16 April 1980; tracks 8 to 11 recorded 16 October 1980)

The contents of disc 1 and most of disc 2 were previously released on other issues of Kilimanjaro: the remainder of disc 2 is taken from the compilation Piano. Disc 3 is mostly taken from The Peel Sessions release, "Suffocate" is a bonus track on the 2000 release of the band's second album Wilder and the other tracks were previously unissued. However, not all tracks from the parent releases are found on this release.

Julian Cope, despite authorising the release of the deluxe edition, later wrote on his website that he felt that the release had a low sound quality and forced fans to buy a vast majority of tracks which they already had while only offering a few newly released rare ones.

Personnel

(original album release)
The Teardrop Explodes
Julian Cope – vocals, bass guitar
David Balfe – piano, organ, synthesizer
Gary Dwyer – drums
Alan Gill – guitar on "Reward" (second edition of album only), "Poppies Are in the Field", "Ha Ha I'm Drowning", "Books" and "When I Dream"

with:

Michael Finkler – guitar on "Second Head", "Brave Boys", "Bouncing Babies",  "Ha Ha I'm Drowning", "Sleeping Gas", "Treason", "Went Crazy" and "Thief of Baghdad"
Hurricane Smith, Ray Martinez – trumpets on "Ha-Ha I'm Drowning", "Sleeping Gas" and "Went Crazy"
Technical
Hugh Jones – engineer
Brian Griffin – photography

(2010 deluxe edition release)

Disc 1 – (Kilimanjaro)

(same credits as for original album release, but remove "Reward" from track listing)

Disc 2 – (Bates Motel)

Julian Cope – vocals, bass guitar, violin on "Strange House in the Snow"
Gary Dwyer – drums
Paul Simpson – organ on "Sleeping Gas" (single version), "Camera Camera" and "Kirby Workers Dream Fades"
Michael Finkler – guitar on "Sleeping Gas" (single version), "Camera Camera", "Kirby Workers Dream Fades", "Bouncing Babies" (single version), "All I Am is Loving You', "Treason" (Zoo single version), "Read It in Books", "Use Me" and "Traison (C'est Juste Une Histoire)"
David Balfe – keyboards on "Reward", "Treason" (Zoo single version), "Read It in Books", "Kilimanjaro", "Reward", "Strange House in the Snow", "Use Me", "Traison (C'est Juste Une Histoire" and "Sleeping Gas" (live version)
Alan Gill – guitar on "Reward", "Kilimanjaro" and "Strange House in the Snow"
Troy Tate – guitar on "Sleeping Gas" (live version) (uncredited)
Ronnie François – bass guitar on "Sleeping Gas" (live version) (uncredited)

Disc 3 – (BBC Sessions)

Julian Cope – vocals, bass guitar
Gary Dwyer – drums
Michael Finkler – guitar on "Brave Boys Keep Their Promises", Ha Ha I'm Drowning", "Went Crazy", "Chance", "The Thief of Baghdad", "When I Dream" and "Poppies in the Field"
Ged Quinn – keyboards on "Brave Boys Keep Their Promises", Ha Ha I'm Drowning", "Went Crazy" and "Chance"
David Balfe – keyboards on "The Thief of Baghdad", "When I Dream" and "Poppies in the Field"
"The Emotional Jungle" – guitar on "Reward", "Suffocate", "For Years" and "The Great Dominions"
"The Evil Wasp" – keyboards on "Reward", "Suffocate", "For Years" and "The Great Dominions"
"The Legendary" Eric Batchelor – trumpet

Charts

Certifications

References

External links

Kilimanjaro 2000 Re-Issue (Adobe Flash) at Radio3Net (streamed copy where licensed)

The Teardrop Explodes albums
1980 debut albums
Albums produced by Bill Drummond
Albums produced by Alan Winstanley
Albums produced by Clive Langer
Albums produced by Mike Howlett
Albums recorded at Rockfield Studios
Mercury Records albums